Eli Crognale (born December 15, 1997) is a retired American soccer player.

Career

Youth and college 
Crognale played with the Columbus Crew SC academy, before playing college soccer at Belmont University in 2016. In 2017, Crognale transferred to the University of Maryland, College Park, where he made 50 appearances for the Terrapins, scoring 5 goals and tallying 9 assists.

While in college, Crognale played with USL PDL side Orange County SC U23 during their 2018 season.

Professional 
On May 7, 2020, Crognale signed his first professional contract with USL Championship side Birmingham Legion. He made his debut on July 15, 2020, appearing as a 58th-minute substitute in a 3-0 win over Memphis 901. On March 22, 2022, Crognale announced his decision to retire from playing professional soccer.

Personal
Eli is the brother of professional soccer player Alex Crognale, who also plays for Birmingham Legion.

References

External links 
 Eli Crognale - Men's Soccer Maryland bio
 Eli Crognale Birmingham Legion bio

1997 births
American soccer players
Association football midfielders
Belmont Bruins men's soccer players
Birmingham Legion FC players
Living people
Maryland Terrapins men's soccer players
Orange County SC U-23 players
Soccer players from Ohio
USL Championship players
USL League Two players